Mary Pat Clarke (born June 22, 1941) is an American politician who represented the 14th district in the Baltimore City Council.  She served in Baltimore, Maryland politics as both council president and council member for 24 out of the last 35 years as of 2010.   She is the first woman ever elected president of the Baltimore City Council and until 2016 was the only non-incumbent to win a council seat since single-member districts were mandated by Baltimore voters through Question P in 2002.

Additionally, Clarke unsuccessfully ran for mayor in 1995

Early life and education
Clarke was born in Providence, Rhode Island on June 22, 1941. She attended Immaculata College where she received an A.B. in 1963 and the a M.A. from the University of Pennsylvania in 1966.

Career
Clarke, by profession, is a teacher.  She has instructed students at the Johns Hopkins University School of Professional Studies, the Maryland Institute College of Art and the University of Maryland, Baltimore County.

Clarke was a founding board member of the Greater Homewood Community Corporation and later president and executive director.  She was instrumental in securing audio equipment for the first performance of Unchained Talent at the Lake Clifton Campus, and she was a funding board member of the non-profit Unchained Talent.

Clarke announced in May 2019 that she would retire from the Baltimore City Council in December 2020. For the 2020 Democratic primary, Clarke endorsed Odette Ramos to succeed her as the council member for the 14th district.

Politics

In the council
Currently, as a member of the Baltimore City Council, Clarke was the Chair of the Education Committee, vice-Chair of the Judiciary and Legislative Investigation Committee, a member of the Budget and Appropriations Committee and the Land Use and Transportation Committee (highways & franchises subcommittee). While running for office, Clarke pushed for integrated slates. She and her New Democratic Club forged alliances with Baltimore's black democratic clubs in the 1970s resulting in the election of several African Americans to the City Council, as well as her own. In the council, she forged alliances with her black colleagues, such as the one with Kweisi Mfume resulting in a Baltimore City mandate for smaller class sizes in the 1980s.

2007 election

Personal life

References

External links
MaryPatClarke.com

University of Baltimore alumni
1941 births
Living people
Baltimore City Council members
Immaculata University alumni
University of Pennsylvania alumni
Johns Hopkins University faculty
University of Maryland, Baltimore County faculty
Politicians from Providence, Rhode Island
Women city councillors in Maryland
American women academics